WOF is an acronym that may refer to:

 Warrant of Fitness, a compulsory yearly or six-monthly test of motor vehicles in New Zealand.
 Wheel of Fortune, a long-running US game show
 Worlds of Fun, a Cedar Fair amusement park in Kansas City, Missouri
 Who's on First, comedy skit
 Who's on First (novel), a novel
 Wildlife Outreach Foundation (Non-Profit Education/Conservation Group in the Southeast)
 Women of Faith, a Christian women's conference organization.
 Worcester Foregate Street railway station, Worcestershire, England (National Rail station code)
 WOF (album), by Quiero Club
 Working Opportunity Fund (managed by PenderFund Capital)
 Wings of Fire, a book series by Tui T. Sutherland
 Wall of Flesh, the pre-hardmode final boss in the famous game, Terraria.
 Wall of Flesh, the peach colored wall that is made of flesh in the TV show, Adventure Time.
 Without Original Fan, a boxed CPU that doesn't include a cooler
 Wings of Fire (disambiguation)
 Width of Fabric, terminology used in Quilting